Maskanah is a village in central Syria, administratively part of the Homs Governorate, located just south of Homs. Nearby localities include Kafr Aya, Qattinah and Abil to the west, Jandar to the south and Fairouzeh and Zaidal to the northeast. According to the Central Bureau of Statistics (CBS), Maskanah had a population of 4,430 in the 2004 census. In 1945 the village had 900 inhabitants. Its inhabitants are predominantly Syriac Orthodox and Catholic Christians.

References

Bibliography

Populated places in Homs District
Syriac Orthodox Christian communities in Syria